The 2019 Copa Paraguay was the second edition of the Copa Paraguay, Paraguay's domestic football cup competition. The competition started on 28 May 2019 and concluded on 5 December 2019. Libertad won their first title in the competition by beating defending champions Guaraní in the final by a 3–0 score. With both champions Libertad and runners-up Guaraní being already qualified for the 2020 Copa Libertadores, and third-placed team Deportivo Capiatá being relegated at the end of the season, the berth to the 2020 Copa Sudamericana the winners were originally entitled to was transferred to the Primera División aggregate table eighth-placed team, Sportivo Luqueño.

Format
For this edition, the competition was expanded from 48 to 64 teams, with the Primera B, Primera C, and UFI being entitled to more berths. Given the expansion, the competition did not feature any preliminary rounds for teams from the lower tiers and the 64 teams directly qualified for the first round. Ties in all rounds were played as a single game, with a penalty shootout deciding the winner in case of a draw.

Teams
64 teams competed in this edition of the competition: the 12 Primera División and 16 División Intermedia teams, as well as 11 from the Primera B, 8 from the Primera C, and the 17 champions from each department of Paraguay representing the UFI.

Primera División
All of the 12 Primera División teams took part in the competition:

 Cerro Porteño
 Deportivo Capiatá
 Deportivo Santaní
 General Díaz
 Guaraní
 Libertad
 Nacional
 Olimpia
 River Plate
 Sol de América
 Sportivo Luqueño
 Sportivo San Lorenzo

División Intermedia
All of the 16 División Intermedia teams took part:

 2 de Mayo
 3 de Febrero (CDE)
 12 de Octubre (I)
 Atyrá
 Deportivo Caaguazú
 Fernando de la Mora
 Fulgencio Yegros
 General Caballero (JLM)
 Guaireña
 Independiente (CG)
 Ovetense
 R.I. 3 Corrales
 Resistencia
 Rubio Ñu
 Sportivo Iteño
 Sportivo Trinidense

Primera B
The 9 teams ranked from 2nd to 10th place in the 2018 Primera B season and the top two in the 2018 Primera C season qualified:

 3 de Febrero FBC
 Atlántida
 Colegiales
 Cristóbal Colón (JAS)
 Cristóbal Colón (Ñ)
 Presidente Hayes
 Recoleta
 Sportivo Ameliano
 Sportivo Limpeño
 Tacuary
 Tembetary

Primera C
Teams ranked from 3rd to 10th place in the previous Primera C season qualified: 

 1° de Marzo
 12 de Octubre (SD)
 Atlético Juventud
 General Caballero (CG)
 Humaitá
 Oriental
 Silvio Pettirossi
 Sport Colonial

UFI
The champions from each of the 17 departments of Paraguay qualified for the competition:

 Sportivo San Juan (Concepción)
 Porvenir FC (San Pedro)
 Sport Valenzolano (Cordillera)
 12 de Octubre (PY) (Guairá)
 Sol de América (P) (Caaguazú)
 16 de Agosto (Caazapá)
 Athletic FBC (Itapúa)
 19 de Marzo FBC (Misiones)
 Sud América (Paraguarí)
 SCD San Antonio (Alto Paraná)
 3 de Mayo (Central)
 1° de Marzo FBC (Ñeembucú)
 Aquidabán (Amambay)
 Sport Santo Domingo (Canindeyú)
 Independiente (N) (Presidente Hayes)
 Nueva Estrella (Boquerón)
 Sport Puerto Diana (Alto Paraguay)

Round of 64
The draw for the round of 64 was held on 16 May 2019 and the matches were played from 28 May to 25 July 2019.

Round of 32
Matches in this round were played from 7 August to 3 September 2019.

Bracket

Round of 16
Matches in this round were played from 10 to 19 September 2019.

Quarterfinals
Matches in this round were played from 9 to 16 October 2019.

Semifinals
The semifinals were played on 5 and 6 November 2019.

Final

Third place play-off

References

External links
Copa Paraguay on the official website of the Paraguayan Football Association 
Copa Paraguay 2019, Soccerway.com

2019 domestic association football cups
2019 in Paraguayan football